Rani Rasmani (Queen Rashmani) is a Bengali historical drama film directed by Kali Prasad Ghosh based on the real-life story of Rani Rasmani. This film was released on 11 February 1955 under the banner of Chalachchitra Pratisthan. Actress Molina Devi played the title role of the movie.

Plot
The movie revolves around the real-life story of Rani Rasmani. Rasmani was brought up in a lower-middle-class family of Kolkata. She marries Rajchandra Das. After the death of her husband the courageous lady takes charge of the zamindari and business and proved herself as an effective leader. She struggles against the evil elements of society.

Cast
 Molina Devi as Rasmani
 Chhabi Biswas as Babu Rajchandra
 Asit Baran
 Bhanu Bandyopadhyay
 Pahari Sanyal
 Gurudas Banerjee as Sriramkrishna
 Utpal Dutt
 Jiben Bose
 Shikharani Bag as Baby Rasmani
 Anup Kumar
 Bibhu Bhattacharya
 Nitish Mukhopadhyay
 Moni Srimani
 Haridhan Mukhopadhyay
 Mihir Bhattacharya
 Nibhanani Debi

References

External links
 

1955 films
Bengali-language Indian films
1950s Bengali-language films
Indian biographical drama films
1950s biographical drama films
Films set in India
Films set in the 18th century
Bengali-language biographical films
Indian historical drama films
Indian black-and-white films
1955 drama films